John G. Smith may refer to:

 John G. Smith (poet) (died 1891), 19th century Scottish poet
 John Gordon Smith (surgeon) (1792–1833), Scottish surgeon and professor of medical jurisprudence
 John Gordon Smith (politician) (1863–1921), member of the Queensland Legislative Council
 J. Gregory Smith (1818–1891), Governor of Vermont
 John G. Smith (coach) (1924–1998), American college baseball, football and basketball coach
 John Smith (Maine politician), Mayor of Saco, Maine and Ku Klux Klan supporter

See also
 John Smith (disambiguation)